Du Chun (born 22 May 1983) is a Chinese actor.

Early life
Du Chun was born in Hebei, China. His parents are also in the performing business. His father, Du Zhiguo is also an actor, and his mother, Yang Li, is a dancer and dancing instructor.
At the age of 11, Du Chun got admitted to The Dance School of Central University of Nationalities (CUN) (i.e. Minzu University of China), one of the key disciplinary bases of national minority arts and the cradle of ethnic dancers, to fulfill his mother's dream to be trained professionally in one of the top dancing schools in China. After graduation, he applied for Central Academy of Drama but failed. After one year preparation, including coached by several prestigious actors, Du got admitted into Beijing Film Academy in 1999 with one of the highest admission test scores even though he did not take the regular middle and high school courses.

Career
In 2003, Du auditioned for a minor role in the historical drama The Emperor in Han Dynasty. But after the audition, the director decided to give him cast him in the role of the young Emperor instead. He showed his acting talent on portraying an ambitious and playful young leader which established his acting career. 
Du then starred in The Prince of Han Dynasty, portraying a Han dynasty general named Li Ling.

In 2007, he was selected as a leading role in a Wuxia drama, The Legend of the Banner Hero, which is adapted from Gu Long's novel. The drama was one of the most popular of the year and was selected as the Best Costume Drama of 2007.

The same year, Du was selected to star in the patriotic drama Logistics Depot 51, a remake of a classic Chinese spy movie during World War II. Following the drama, Du rose in popularity and was hailed as one of the new generation patriotic idols. He won the Best Actor award at the TVS Award Ceremony.

He then starred in another patriotic drama Emigrate to the West. The drama registered an average viewing rate of 9.6 percent, the highest rating for a CCTV series since 2002. He received a best actor nomination in the 41st Monte Carlo TV festival.

Du moved on to idol dramas next. In 2010, he starred in the romantic comedy series Rent a Girlfriend for the New Year. The drama was well-received by viewers, who praised the drama for being heartwarming and meaningful. The same year, he starred in the family drama Puberty hit Menopause, which won him the Most Popular Actor award at the China Student Television Festival.

In 2011, Du starred in the time-travel romantic drama Fight and Love with a Terracotta Warrior, a remake of the classical movie played by Zhang Yimou and Gong Li. The same year, he played Ximen Qing, a notorious playboy figure in Chinese classical literature All Men Are Brothers.

In 2012, Du starred in the youth drama Beijing Youth, directed by Zhao Baogang.  The drama, about teens in Beijing struggling against the strict and traditional culture of their parents, was well received among young Chinese mainland audiences. The same year, he starred in the historical time-travel hit Palace II and rose in popularity.

In  2013,  Du starred in the drama Hello 30 Years Old, which also talks about the struggles of youths born after 80s and resonated with the audience. The same year, he played Li Shimin in the historical drama Heroes in Sui and Tang Dynasties.

In 2015, Du starred in the historical romance drama Love Yunge from the Desert, based on Tong Hua's novel Song in the Clouds. The same year, he starred in the family drama Pretty Wife.

Filmography

Film

Television series

Discography

Awards and nominations

References

Living people
Male actors from Hebei
1981 births
People from Xingtai
Chinese television producers
Chinese male film actors
Chinese male television actors
Hui male actors
21st-century Chinese male actors